The Frontier Crimes Regulations (FCR) were a special set of laws of British India, and  which were applicable to the Federally Administered Tribal Areas (FATA). They were enacted by in the nineteenth century and remained in effect in Pakistan until 2018. They were extended to the Gilgit Agency in Jammu and Kashmir in 1901 and to Baltistan in 1947, remaining in effect till the 1970s.

The law stated that three basic rights are not applicable to the residents of FATA – appeal, wakeel and daleel (the right to request a change to a conviction in any court, the right to legal representation and the right to present reasoned evidence, respectively).

Following the passing of the Twenty-Fifth Amendment to the Constitution of Pakistan by both Houses of Parliament and the Provincial Assembly of Khyber Pakhtunkhwa, President Mamnoon Hussain abolished the FCR and replaced it with the FATA Interim Governance Regulation, 2018, which lays out the future for FATA being merged with Khyber Pakhtunkhwa and placed FATA under direct federal administration, removing its semi-autonomous status.

History
The Murderous Outrages Regulation was enacted in British India (which included modern-day Pakistan) in 1867 to give the colonial government additional powers to prosecute serious crimes such as murder. It was re-enacted in 1873 with minor modifications, and again in 1877 as the "Ghazi Act" for its use in the Pashtun-inhabited frontier districts. The 1893 unilateral demarcation of the Durand Line by Mortimer Durand as the border between Afghanistan and British India, which divided Pashtun tribes across the border, caused further animosity among the Pashtun.

In 1901, the Frontier Crimes Regulations were enacted in British India. In 1947, the Pakistani government added the clause to the act that residents could be arrested without specifying the crime. The BBC notes that "political activists term the FCR a black law because the accused cannot get bail in such cases."

The FCR permits collective punishment of family or tribe members for crimes of individuals. It permits punishment to be meted out by unelected tribal jirgas and denies the accused the right to trial by judiciary. Tribal chiefs can also be held responsible for handing over suspects charged by the federal government without specifying an offence. Failure to comply can make the tribal chiefs liable for punishment. Human rights activists and the superior judiciary have argued that the regulation violates basic human rights.

The regulation denies those convicted of an offence by a tribal jirga the right to appeal their conviction in any court. It gives the federal government the right to seize private property in FATA and to convict an individual without due process. It lets the government restrict the entry of a FATA tribe member into a settled district in the rest of Pakistan. The discriminatory provisions of the regulation, both substantive as well as procedural - e.g. selection of jirga members (section 2), trial procedure in civil/criminal matters (sections 8 & 11), demolition of and restriction of construction of hamlet, village or tower in the North-West Frontier Province (section 31), method of arrest/ detention (section 38 & 39) security for good behaviour (sections 40, 42), imposition/collection of fine (sections 22-27), etc. are in violation of the Constitution of Pakistan. The FCR denies tribal residents: the right to be dealt with in accordance with the law; the security of person; safeguards to arrest and detention; protection against double jeopardy or self- incrimination; the inviolability of the dignity of man; prohibition of torture for the purpose of extracting evidence; protection of property rights; and the equality of citizens.

Other articles of the Constitution of Pakistan, such as Article 247, ensure that FATA residents cannot overturn the FCR.

Status in Pakistan

In August 2011, President Asif Ali Zardari enacted a presidential order to amend the FCR. Widely viewed as the most substantive changes in the 110-year history of the regulation, the reforms included new time limits on the amount of time local administration officials can wait before informing that they have taken someone prisoner. In addition, the 2011 amendments placed new restrictions on the collective responsibility clause in the regulation. Among others, changes included:

 Protection of women, children below 16 and all people above 65 from collective responsibility arrest
 Prohibition against arresting an entire tribe under collective responsibility
 Time limits for disposing of cases
 Provision for a more independent appeals process
 Appellate authority power to review decisions
 Strengthening of the FATA Tribunal
 Power to transfer cases from political agent to assistant political agent
 Concept of bail
 Jail inspections
 Voluntary reference to a council of elders and Qaumi Jirga (people's assembly)
 Inclusion of local customs and traditions (Rewaj)
 Fines on communities in case of murder
 Forfeiture of public salary for involvement in crime
 Arrest by authorities other than political agent
 Checks on arbitrary power to arrest
 Punishment and compensation for false prosecutions
 No deprivation of property rights without compensation
 Audit of political agent funds

If implemented in true letter and spirit of the law, these changes could have had a significant impact on the civil and human rights of citizens in Pakistan's tribal areas. However, the changes have been widely criticized and the political administration accused of lacking the will to implement and enforce the FCR as revised in 2011.

According to the FCR despite the presence of elected tribal representatives, the Parliament of Pakistan can play no role in the affairs of FATA.

Article 247 of the Pakistani Constitution provides that no Act of Parliament applies to FATA, unless the President of Pakistan consents. Only the President is authorized to amend laws and promulgate ordinances for the tribal areas. The elected representatives thus have no say in administration of FATA. It also repeals the jurisdiction of Pakistan's courts over FATA. By inference, this also limits the application of fundamental rights to FATA.

Article 247 and the Federal Crimes Regulation have been condemned by several jurists. Late Chief Justice of the Supreme Court, Justice Alvin Robert Cornelius, said that the FCR is "obnoxious to all recognised modern principles governing the dispensation of justice" in the case of Sumunder vs State (PLD 1954 FC 228).)

After taking a unanimous vote of confidence on 29 March 2008, then Prime Minister of Pakistan, Yousaf Raza Gilani, expressed his government's desire to repeal the FCR.

FATA merger with KP
The National Assembly of Pakistan on Thursday, 24 May 2018, passed a historical constitutional amendment seeking the much-awaited merger of the Federally Administered Tribal Areas (Fata) with Khyber Pakhtunkhwa (KP) with a 229-1 vote in favour.

This negates the effect of FCR in FATA, rendering it liable to laws and regulations passed by the KP assembly and operating under the constitution of Pakistan, after an at most two years interim period during which the federal government will manage the transition.

See also
 Faqir of Ipi
 Murderous Outrages Regulation (1867, 1877, 1901)
 Shoukat Aziz

References

History of Khyber Pakhtunkhwa
Political history of Pakistan
Human rights abuses in Pakistan
Law of Pakistan
Federally Administered Tribal Areas
1901 in law
1901 in British India
Repealed Pakistani legislation
Legislation in British India